The Americas Zone was one of three zones of regional competition in the 2001 Fed Cup.

Group I
Venue: Montevideo, Uruguay (outdoor clay)
Date: 23–28 April

The nine teams were divided into two pools of four and five teams. The teams that finished first in the pools played-off to determine which team would partake in the World Group Play-offs. The two nations coming last in the pools were relegated to Group II for 2002.

Pools

Play-off

  advanced to 2001 World Group Play-offs.
  and  relegated to Group II in 2002.

Group II
Venue: St. John's, Antigua and Barbuda (outdoor hard)
Date: 15–19 May

The fourteen teams were randomly divided into four pools of three and four teams to compete in round-robin competitions. The teams then competed in knockout tournaments with teams that had taken equal placements in their pools to determine overall placings for the group. Teams finishing first and second advanced to Group I for 2002.

Pools

Play-offs

  and  advanced to Group I in 2002.

See also
Fed Cup structure

References

 Fed Cup Profile, Canada
 Fed Cup Profile, Venezuela
 Fed Cup Profile, Brazil
 Fed Cup Profile, Colombia
 Fed Cup Profile, Uruguay
 Fed Cup Profile, Paraguay
 Fed Cup Profile, Mexico
 Fed Cup Profile, Puerto Rico
 Fed Cup Profile, Bolivia
 Fed Cup Profile, Jamaica
 Fed Cup Profile, Chile
 Fed Cup Profile, Trinidad and Tobago
 Fed Cup Profile, Panama
 Fed Cup Profile, Antigua and Barbuda
 Fed Cup Profile, Costa Rica
 Fed Cup Profile, Guatemala
 Fed Cup Profile, El Salvador
 Fed Cup Profile, Barbados

External links
 Fed Cup website

 
Americas
Sports competitions in Montevideo
Tennis tournaments in Uruguay
Sport in St. John's, Antigua and Barbuda
Tennis tournaments in Antigua and Barbuda
2001 in Uruguayan tennis
International sports competitions hosted by Uruguay
Women's sports competitions in Uruguay
International sports competitions hosted by Antigua and Barbuda